This is a list of Palermo Football Club managers since 1930:

References

Managers

Palermo